Morpho didius, the giant blue morpho, is a Neotropical butterfly belonging to the subfamily Morphinae of family Nymphalidae. It is considered, by some authors, to be a subspecies of Morpho menelaus.

Description

Morpho didius has a wingspan reaching , making it one of the largest of Morpho species. The dorsal side of the wings are iridescent and metallic blue, and the forewings are quite elongated.

Distribution
This species can be found in Peru.

Biology
The larva feeds on palm trees.

References
BioLib.cz
"Morpho Fabricius, 1807" at Markku Savela's Lepidoptera and Some Other Life Forms
Butterflies of America Images of type and other specimens of Morpho menelaus didius.
Better Butterfly Creations
Paul Smart, 1976 The Illustrated Encyclopedia of the Butterfly World in Color. London, Salamander: Encyclopedie des papillons. Lausanne, Elsevier Sequoia (French language edition)   page 235 fig. 7 female (Peru)

Morpho
Butterflies described in 1874
Nymphalidae of South America
Taxa named by Carl H. Eigenmann